Siah Gel (also Romanized as Sīāh Gel and Seyahgel; also known as Seyyed Kal) is a village in Jayezan Rural District, Jayezan District, Omidiyeh County, Khuzestan Province, Iran. At the 2006 census, its population was 282, in 59 families.

References 

Populated places in Omidiyeh County